"Kalimba de Luna" is a 1982 single by Italian musician and drummer Tony Esposito. It was written by Esposito with his long-time collaborator Remo Licastro, pianist Giuseppe "Joe" Amoruso, keyboardist Mauro Malavasi and vocalist Gianluigi Di Franco. It was taken from Esposito's album Il grande esploratore. "Kalimba de Luna" was a European success and reached no. 3 in the Austrian chart, no. 6 in the Swiss charts and no. 14 in the Italian charts.

Charts

Boney M. version

"Kalimba de Luna" was instantly covered by German group Boney M. for the German market, giving the group their first Top 20 hit in three years, peaking at no. 17. An edit of the single was also added to new pressings of the group's then-current album Ten Thousand Lightyears and the compilation album Kalimba de Luna – 16 Happy Songs. With lead vocals by new group member Reggie Tsiboe, the original idea was to release it as a solo single, and a video was shot with Reggie only before the plans were changed to release it as a Boney M. single, and a new video with the group was done. Neither Liz Mitchell nor Marcia Barrett sang on this recording—the backing vocals were done by producer Frank Farian and session singers Amy & Elaine Goff.

Charts

Weekly charts

Year-end charts

Releases
7" Single
"Kalimba de Luna" – 4:31 / "10.000 Lightyears" (Kawohl, Björklund, Farian, Bischof) – 4:29 (Hansa 106 760-100, Germany)

12" Single
"Kalimba de Luna" (Club Mix) 7:07 / "10.000 Lightyears" – 4:29 (Hansa 601 470-213, Germany)
"Kalimba de Luna" (US Club Mix) 9:15 / "Kalimba de Luna" (Dub Mix) – 6:40 (Hansa 601 532-213, Germany)

Note : This single is the first which does not have the name "Boney M." written with the logo created eight years before for the "Daddy cool" single (the only previous exception being the "Baby do you wanna bump" single, which went out before the group even existed)

Other cover versions

Pepe Goes to Cuba version
"Kalimba de Luna" also was instantly covered by Pepe Goes to Cuba (Pepe Gonzales) in 1984. This version peaked at no. 34 in Germany.

Dalida version
French singer Dalida also released a French and English version of "Kalimba de Luna" in 1984 as a single and also as part of her album Dali. A remix of Dalida's version was released during the summer of 2011 in France.

Sources

1984 singles
1982 songs
Boney M. songs
Hansa Records singles
Song recordings produced by Frank Farian
Songs written by Mauro Malavasi
Songs written by Tony Esposito (musician)
English-language Italian songs